Iliman Cheikh Baroy Ndiaye (born 6 March 2000) is a professional footballer who plays as an attacking midfielder for EFL Championship club Sheffield United. Born in France, he plays for the Senegal national team.

Club career
On 17 November 2017, Ndiaye signed his first contract with Boreham Wood. On 31 August 2019, he signed with Sheffield United. He joined Hyde United on loan for the latter half of the 2019–20 season. He made his professional debut with Sheffield United as a late substitute in a 5–0 Premier League loss to Leicester City on 14 March 2021. On his full Sheffield United debut, he scored twice against Peterborough United on 11 September in a 6–2 win. On 3 March 2023 in the FA Cup he scored in the 79th minute against Tottenham Hotspur to secure victory and ensure Sheffield Utd’s place in the quarter finals.

International career
Ndiaye was born in France to a Senegalese father and French mother. He debuted with the Senegal national team in a 3–1 2023 Africa Cup of Nations qualification win over Benin in the 67th minute when he was substituted on for Boulaye Dia on 4 June 2022.

Career statistics

Club

References

External links
 
 Hyde United Profile

2000 births
Living people
Footballers from Rouen
Citizens of Senegal through descent
Senegalese footballers
Senegal international footballers
French footballers
Senegalese people of French descent
French sportspeople of Senegalese descent
Association football midfielders
Boreham Wood F.C. players
Sheffield United F.C. players
Hyde United F.C. players
Premier League players
2022 FIFA World Cup players
Senegalese expatriate footballers
Senegalese expatriates in England
French expatriate footballers
French expatriates in England
Expatriate footballers in England